The 2016 S.League season is Geylang International's 21st season in the top flight of Singapore football and 42nd year in existence as a football club. The club will also compete in the Singapore League Cup and the Singapore Cup.

Squad

Coaching staff

Pre-Season Transfers

In

Out

Pre-season Friendlies

Competition

S.League

Round 1

Round 2

Round 3

Singapore Cup

Geylang International lost 2-4 on aggregate.

Singapore TNP League Cup

Team statistics

Appearances

Numbers in parentheses denote appearances as substitute.

Goalscorers

Disciplinary record

Geylang International FC seasons
Singaporean football clubs 2016 season